The New York City Law Department, also known as the Office of the Corporation Counsel, is the department of the government of New York City responsible for most of the city's legal affairs. The department is headed by the Corporation Counsel, currently Sylvia Hinds-Radix, the 81st official to hold this position.

The Law Department represents the mayor, city agencies, and city officials in all civil litigation, in juvenile delinquency proceedings in Family Court, and in prosecutions in the New York City Criminal Court under the New York City Administrative Code. Among the department's other duties are drafting contracts, leases, municipal bond issues, and other legal documents for the city; reviewing local and state legislation; and providing legal advice to city officials on a wide variety of issues.

The New York City Charter, the New York City Administrative Code, and the Rules of the City of New York are published online by American Legal Publishing Corporation under contract with the Law Department. The department's regulations are compiled in title 46 of the Rules.

History
The origins of the Law Department lie in the English office of the Recorder. After the City fell under British control following the Third Anglo-Dutch War, New York's Royal Governor Thomas Dongan created the Office of Recorder of New York City in 1683 to serve as legal and political counsel to the City Government.

After the American Revolution, New York City continued to grow, and during the 19th century, the City Council began hiring private attorneys to do the internal legal work of the City. When this arrangement proved unsatisfactory, due to the chaos of shifting the city's caseload between various outside counsels, the City Charter was amended in 1849 to create the Office of the Corporation Counsel (so named because New York City is a municipal corporation). The revision established an independently elected chief executive officer known as the Corporation Counsel, and a staff of five, to be known as the Law Department. Later, the Corporation Counsel began being appointed by the Mayor of New York City, as is still the case today.

Among the better-known cases that the department has litigated before the U.S. Supreme Court are Goldberg v. Kelly, Penn Central Transportation Co. v. New York City, Ward v. Rock Against Racism, Massachusetts v. Environmental Protection Agency, Permanent Mission of India v. City of New York, and New York State Rifle & Pistol Association Inc. v. City of New York.  The department also prepares amicus curiae briefs in many major court cases.

The following individuals have led the Law Department as Corporation Counsel: 
Lorenzo B. Shepard, former U.S. Attorney for the Southern District of New York
Henry Rutgers Beekman, former judge of the New York Supreme Court and New York City Parks Commissioner
Greene C. Bronson, former judge of the New York Court of Appeals
Edward D. Smith, former U.S. Attorney for the Southern District of New York
William C. Whitney, former U.S. Secretary of the Navy
E. Henry Lacombe, former judge of the United States Court of Appeals for the Second Circuit
George L. Rives, former United States Assistant Secretary of State
Francis Key Pendleton, former justice of the Supreme Court of New York
Frank Polk, former Undersecretary of State and name partner of Davis Polk & Wardwell
Lamar Hardy, former U.S. Attorney for the Southern District of New York
John P. O'Brien, former New York City Mayor
Allen G. Schwartz, former judge of the United States District Court for the Southern District of New York
Thomas D. Thacher, former judge of the United States District Court for the Southern District of New York, judge of the New York Court of Appeals, and Solicitor General of the United States
John J. Bennett Jr., former Attorney General of New York
Adrian P. Burke, former judge of the New York Court of Appeals
 Charles H. Tenney, former judge of the United States District Court for the Southern District of New York
J. Lee Rankin, former Solicitor General of the United States
Norman Redlich, former dean of New York University School of Law
Peter Zimroth, former NYU professor and law clerk to Justice Abe Fortas of the Supreme Court of the United States
Frederick A.O. Schwarz Jr., former chief counsel to the Church Committee
Paul A. Crotty, current judge of the United States District Court for the Southern District of New York
Zachary W. Carter, former United States Attorney for the Eastern District of New York
Paul Windels, lawyer, co-founder of the Lycée Français de New York

Organizational structure
The Law Department has 16 legal divisions and 5 support divisions. , the department employs 850 lawyers and 750 support professionals in 22 offices located in all five boroughs, and an auxiliary office in Kingston, New York.

The legal divisions are:
Administrative Law and Regulatory Litigation
Affirmative Litigation
Appeals
Commercial and Real Estate Litigation
Contracts and Real Estate
Economic Development
Environmental Law
Family Court
General Litigation
Labor and Employment Law
Legal Counsel
Municipal Finance
Special Federal Litigation (handles civil rights lawsuits under 42 U.S.C. 1983 brought against police, District Attorneys, or correction officers)
Tax and Bankruptcy
Tort
Workers' Compensation

The support divisions are:
Administration
Electronic Discovery Group
Information Technology
Litigation Support and Information Management
Operations

See also
 The City Record
 Rules of the City of New York
 New York State Department of Law

References

Further reading

External links

 Law Department in the Rules of the City of New York
 CityAdmin, a collection of NYC administrative decisions from the Center for New York City Law

Law
Government agencies established in 1849
1849 establishments in New York (state)